The Polish Academy Award for Best Film Cinematography is an annual award given to the best Polish cinematography of the year.

Winners and nominees

References

External links
 Polish Film Awards; Official website 

Awards for best cinematography
Polish film awards
Awards established in 1999